Howard Benson is an American music producer and multi-instrumentalist. He was nominated for the Producer of the Year Grammy Award in 2007 and 2008.

Early life and education
Benson was born and raised in a middle-class family in greater Philadelphia, the son of Estelle and Robert Benson. He is of Jewish descent. He began playing keyboards in rock bands at the age of 13. He attended college at Drexel University and studied engineering. During his years at Drexel, Benson took a year off and studied composition at the Philadelphia College for Performing Arts. Benson graduated from Drexel with a degree in materials engineering. After graduation, he moved to Los Angeles and worked for Garrett AiResearch, where he worked on aircraft such as C-5s and F-18s.

At the time of his graduation, he regularly played with his band in small Hollywood clubs, and when his band finally went into the studio with a producer, Benson was inspired to become a record producer.

He returned to Drexel in 2010 to create and teach the advanced production class at Drexel University's Antoinette Westphal College of Media Arts and Design. In 2011, he established the Howard and Monica Benson Endowed Scholarship Fund for students enrolled at the Antoinette Westphal College of Media Arts and Design. In 2015, he received an honorary degree from Drexel University.

Career 
His first works as producer were two albums for hardcore punk band T.S.O.L. (Revenge (1986) and Hit and Run (1987)), and the first record he produced for a major record label was Bang Tango's Psycho Café in 1989. Benson states that discovering Pro Tools in 1998 while working with Sepultura was a major turning point in his career. He was asked to produce P.O.D.'s The Fundamental Elements of Southtown album in 1999, which became a platinum-selling record. In 2000, Benson produced P.O.D.'s multi-platinum-selling Satellite at Bay 7 Studios, and continued to record numerous albums at that location. Over the next few years, Benson produced records from acts like Cold, Crazy Town, P.O.D.'s Payable on Death, and Three Cheers for Sweet Revenge from My Chemical Romance. He later produced numerous multi-platinum records such as The All-American Rejects, Hoobastank, Flyleaf, Daughtry, Seether, Third Day, Theory of a Deadman, Three Days Grace, Skillet, Santana, Adam Lambert,  Kelly Clarkson and Caleb Johnson.

He now produces exclusively at West Valley Recording Studios, in Woodland Hills.

Benson stated that he utilizes Auto-Tune in the studio and that those who do not are "nuts". Benson prefers to record in what he calls a "parallel system," in which musicians will record their parts in isolated rooms. After the recording of an album, Benson typically brings the track to his home studio, Sparky Dark Studios, where he personally adds to the arrangement.

Benson has worked as an A&R consultant at Giant Records, Elektra Records, and Warner Bros. Records.

Benson produced and appears in Attack of Life: The Bang Tango Movie, which is a 2016 documentary film directed by Drew Fortier about 80s hard rock band Bang Tango for whom Benson had produced two albums.

In 2021 Benson and Three Days Grace drummer Neil Sanderson co-founded the record label Judge & Jury Records.

Discography 
Howard Benson has produced dozens of discs throughout his career for many top artists including Three Days Grace, My Chemical Romance, and Daughtry.

Awards

Grammy Awards 

|-
|rowspan="1"|2001
|"Alive"
|Best Metal Performance
|
|-
|rowspan="2"|2002
|"Youth of the Nation"
|Best Hard Rock Performance
|
|-
|"Portrait"
|Best Metal Performance
|
|-
|rowspan="2"|2005
|The Reason
|Best Pop Vocal Album
|
|-
|"The Reason"
|Best Pop Performance by a Duo or Group with Vocals
|
|-
|rowspan="5"|2007
|Himself
|Producer of the Year, Non-Classical
|
|-
|Daughtry
|Best Rock Album
|
|-
|"It's Not Over"
|Best Rock Song
|
|-
|"Home"
|Best Pop Performance by a Duo or Group with Vocals
|
|-
|"It's Not Over"
|Best Rock Performance by a Duo or Group with Vocals
|
|-
|rowspan="1"|2008
|Himself
|Producer of the Year, Non-Classical
|
|-
|rowspan="3"|2010
|All I Ever Wanted
|Best Pop Vocal Album
|
|-
|"Born Again"
|Best Gospel Performance
|
|-
|"Born Again"
|Best Gospel Song
|
|-
|rowspan="2"|2013
|Stronger
|Best Pop Vocal Album
|
|-
|"Love Bites (So Do I)"
|Best Hard Rock/Metal Performance
|

GMA Dove Awards 

|-
|rowspan="1"|2005
|The Passion of the Christ: Songs
| Special Event Album of the Year
|
|-
|rowspan="1"|2009
|Revelation
| Pop/Contemporary Album of the Year
|
|-
|rowspan="2"|2010
|Awake
| Rock Album of the Year
|
|-
|"Hero"
| Rock Song of the Year
|
|-
|rowspan="3"|2011
|Memento Mori
| Rock Album of the Year
|
|-
|"One Day Too Late"
| Rock Song of the Year
|
|-
|"Lucy"
| Rock Song of the Year
|
|-
|rowspan="6"|2013
|New Horizons
| Rock Album of the Year
|
|-
|Release the Panic
| Rock Album of the Year
|
|-
|"Sick of It"
| Rock Song of the Year
|
|-
|"Who We Are"
| Rock Song of the Year
|
|-
|"Perfect Life"
| Rock Song of the Year
|
|-
|"Strike Back"
| Rock Song of the Year
|
|-
|rowspan="6"|2014
|Rise
| Rock Album of the Year
|
|-
|Release the Panic: Recalibrated
| Rock Album of the Year
|
|-
|"Not Gonna Die"
| Rock Song of the Year
|
|-
|"Die For You"
| Rock Song of the Year
|
|-
|"Run and Escape"
| Rock Song of the Year
|
|-
|"Zombie"
| Rock Song of the Year
|
|-
|rowspan="2"|2015
|"Good to Be Alive"
| Rock Song of the Year
|
|-
|"Dead Man"
| Rock Song of the Year
|

Products
In 2017 Howard Benson partnered with audio plug-in developer STL Tones to create the Howard Benson - Producer Kemper Pack and in 2018 they released STL Tonality - Howard Benson Guitar Plug-In Suite. In 2020 Howard partnered with Joey Sturgis Tones and released his signature vocals plugin, Howard Benson Vocals. In 2022, Howard partnered with Joey Sturgis Tones again and released his signature voice generation plug-in, the Howard Benson Vocal Multiplier.

References

External links
 Official website (howardbenson.com)
 Howard Benson - Producer Kemper Pack
 STL Tonality - Howard Benson

Living people
1956 births
Record producers from Pennsylvania
20th-century American Jews
Drexel University alumni
University of the Arts (Philadelphia) alumni
21st-century American Jews